Mohammadabad-e Ilkhani (also Romanized as Moḩammadābād-e Īlkhānī; also known as Moḩammadābād-e Qods (Persian: محمداباد قدس) and Moḩammadābād) is a village in Tus Rural District, in the Central District of Mashhad County, Razavi Khorasan Province, Iran. At the 2006 census, its population was 595, in 143 families.

References 

Populated places in Mashhad County